Isis, in comics, may refer to:

 Isis (DC Comics), a comic book character originally featured in the TV show The Secret of Isis
 Isis (cat), a cat owned by supervillainess Catwoman that featured in Batman: The Animated Series and Krypto the Superdog
 Isis (Bluewater Comics), superhero created by Angel Gate Press and Image Comics
 Isis (Marvel Comics), an Egyptian goddess in the Marvel Universe

See also
Isis (disambiguation)